The Huairen Hall or Huairentang is a building inside Zhongnanhai, the Chinese government's leadership compound in Beijing. It has been the site of several major events in Chinese history. Huairen Hall is the main meeting place of the Politburo of the Communist party of China and an alternate meeting place of the Standing Committee. The building is also the meeting location of several of the Communist Party's leading groups such as the Financial and Economic Affairs Leading Group and the Leading Group for Comprehensively Deepening Reforms.

History 
Construction of the hall began in 1885 and was overseen by Yixuan, Prince Chun. In 1888 the hall became the daily workplace of Dowager Empress Cixi the then de facto ruler of China, replacing the Hall of Mental Cultivation in the nearby Forbidden City. After the Boxer rebellion, Huairentang became the headquarters of occupying Eight Nation Alliance's commander Alfred von Waldersee. In 1902 Empress Cixi rebuilt Huairentang at a cost of five million taels of silver and in 1908 she died there.

After the founding of the Republic of China in 1911, President Yuan Shikai used the building to meet with foreign guests and to accept New Year's day greetings. After Yuan's death, it was the site of his funeral. When Cao Kun became president, he used Huairentang as his residence. After the end of the Beiyang Government Huairentang had no permanent use and was given to the Beijing City Government.

After the founding of the People's Republic of China, the first plenary session of the Chinese People's Political Consultative Conference was held in Huairen Hall in 1949. In 1953, the building was remodeled as a two-story hall in preparation for the Asia-Pacific Peace Conference by Premier Zhou Enlai. The new meeting hall was then used for first session of the National People's Congress in 1954. Huairen Hall became the auditorium of the central government, often hosting various art shows and political meetings, including Central Committee plenums before the construction of Jingxi Hotel in 1964.

Historical events 
 1930 - Central Plains War: During the second session of an expanded meeting of the Kuomintang Central Executive Committee, opponents of Chiang Kai-shek jointly elected Yan Xishan as president of the national government.
 1949 - The first plenary session of the Chinese People's Political Consultative Conference
 1951 - The "Agreement between the Central People's Government and the Tibetan Local Government on the Peaceful Liberation of Tibet" was signed in Huairentang.
 1954 - The first Session of the first National People's Congress.
 1955 - The Huairentang grant, Mao Zedong on behalf of the central government awarded ten People's Liberation Army generals the rank of Marshal.
 1958 - Liu Bocheng is criticized =as part of the Communist party's anti-dogmatism campaign.
 1967 - February Countercurrent.
 1976 - The "Huairentang Incident": The "Gang of Four" were arrested, marking the end of the Cultural Revolution.
 1989 - Hu Yaobang collapsed during a Politburo meeting in Huairentang, and subsequently died, sparking the Tiananmen Square protests of 1989.

References 

Buildings and structures in Beijing
Qing dynasty architecture